Undoolya Station is a  pastoral lease east of Alice Springs in the Northern Territory of Australia. It has been managed by the Hayes Family since 1906. It is currently managed by Ben and Nicole Hayes.

Early history

Central Aranda people have lived on Undoolya Station and the surrounding region for thousands of years.
 
Undoolya Station was established by South Australian pastoralist and stock agent Edward Mead Bagot. After working the southern section of the Overland Telegraph Line, Bagot applied for two leases adjoining the Alice Springs Telegraph Station in 1872. His friend Joseph Gilbert also applied for two blocks, closer to where Owen Springs Station is today. Bagot's son Ted, Churchill Smith and Joseph Gilbert's son William, selected cattle on Gilbert's Pewsey Vale Station to stock the new Central Australian leases. They undertook the first large cattle drove from South Australia to Alice Springs in June. It is considered to be one of the great droving feats in Australia history, during which they met Charles Todd returning from his first inspection of the southern end of the Overland Telegraph Line, as well as well-known explorers Ernest Giles, Peter Warburton and William Gosse. Emily Gap became their temporary camp upon arrival until construction of a homestead began in 1873.

Undoolya was purchased by William Hayes and his wife Mary in 1906. In 1911, the Commonwealth Department of External Affairs stated the need for a horse breeding station, to meet a contract with the Indian Army to supply them with over 4000 horses annually. The Undoolya leases were identified as a potential location since they were up for renewal in September 1911. After much uncertainty, the leases were signed and delivered to the Hayes family on 15 September 1921. By then William Hayes had died, so his son Edward Hayes became general manager and moved from Maryvale Station to Undoolya with his wife Ann. In 1930 the family company was dissolved and the Hayes family properties were put up for auction in 1930. He purchased Undoolya and sold Maryvale and Owen Springs. After serious drought conditions, Hayes realised the need for dams and developed the infrastructure on Undoolya. He also introduced Poll Herefords to the station, the first to bring them to Central Australia. By 1935 he had grown the station to 2000 cattle, 150 horses and 400 goats.

In 1950, Edward Hayes sold the station to his son Edward Junior, better known as Ted (-1988) and his wife Jean. In 1960 Ted purchased Deep Well Station. He was forced to move all his cattle to Undoolya Station in 1964 to 1965 due to drought, abandoning Deep Well. All staff relocated to Undoolya also. Despite challenging climatic conditions, Ted doubled the capacity of Undoolya over the last 30 years of his life, leaving the station to his wife and sons. The station remains in the family and is currently run by Ben and Nicole Hayes.

Current use

Cattle

The Hayes continue to run Poll Hereford cattle on the property. It is European Union-accredited and has been part of a Meat Standards Australia grading program since 2009. They predominately supply cattle to T&R Pastoral abattoir at Murray Bridge or Victorian feedlots.

Horticulture

The Hayes Family cleared part of the station in 2002 to establish Rocky Hill Table Grapes. They have also grown lucerne, onions, cabbages and other vegetables. Rocky Hill was granted an increased water extraction license in 2015, causing concern among some local residents and environmental groups.

See also
List of ranches and stations

References

Pastoral leases in the Northern Territory